Xiahou Hui (220 - 243), courtesy name Zhiquan, was an official of the state of Cao Wei during the Three Kingdoms period of China.

Life
Xiahou Hui was the sixth son of Xiahou Yuan, a general who served under Cao Cao, the warlord who laid the foundation for the Cao Wei state in the late Eastern Han dynasty before the Three Kingdoms period. As a youth, he was already known for being knowledgeable, well-read and talented in literary arts. He served in various positions in the Cao Wei government, including Gentleman of the Yellow Gate (黃門侍郎), Chancellor (相) of Yan State (燕國), and Administrator (太守) of Le'an Commandery (樂安郡). He also had several debates with Zhong Yu (锺毓), a son of Zhong Yao. He died at the age of 36.

See also
 Lists of people of the Three Kingdoms

References

 Chen, Shou (3rd century). Records of the Three Kingdoms (Sanguozhi).
 Pei, Songzhi (5th century). Annotations to Records of the Three Kingdoms (Sanguozhi zhu).

Year of birth unknown
Year of death unknown
Cao Wei generals
Cao Wei politicians
Political office-holders in Shandong